Cleanup, clean up or clean-up may refer to:
 Cleanup (animation), a stage of animation workflow
 Clean-up (environment), environmental action to remove litter from a place
 Cleanup hitter, a baseball position
 Clean-up Records, a record label imprint
 Code cleanup, an aspect of computer programming
 Operation Clean-up, Pakistani military intelligence operation

See also 

 Cleaning
 Environmental remediation
 National CleanUp Day
 World Cleanup Day